FK Rabotnichki or more commonly Rabotnički (old transliteration) and Rabotnicki is a football club that plays at the Toshe Proeski Arena in Skopje, North Macedonia. They currently compete in the Macedonian First League.

History
FK Rabotnichki was founded in 1937 as SK Rabotnichki Skopje. It is widely regarded as the ‘railway football club’. It started competing in the 1938–39 Second League of the Skoplje Football Subassociation which finished 4th out of 5 teams.  However the next season Radnički won the league with no defeats among 6 teams and with a goal difference of 45–6, thus earning promotion to the First League of the Skoplje Football Subassociation. However the 1940–41 season of the First League of the Skoplje Football Subassociation was interrupted by the start of the Second World War.  By the time Rabotnički had one win, two draws and one defeat.

After the end of the war, for a long time, Rabotnichki competed in the Federal Second League or the Macedonian Republic League. They also competed in the First Federal League of SFR Yugoslavia for two years. Since the Republic of Macedonia became an independent country, Rabotnichki constantly competes in the Macedonian First League. In all these years since its establishing in 1937, Rabotnichki has always been among the best clubs, and has always been a good representative of Macedonian football in Europe.

Rabotnički Kometal
The club's most successful years were those between 2001 and 2008 when the club was acquired by the famous company Kometal. Since it was acquired by Kometal, Rabotnichki showed constant progress: in 2002–03 they finished second in the national league and competed in the UEFA Cup, (2004–05) they won the national championship and competed in the qualifications for the UEFA Champions League, and in (2007–08) they had their best year by winning the double crown. Kometal and Trifun Kostovski left Rabotnichki and took over Vardar in 2008. The following year they won the Macedonian Cup for the second time in club history.

On 14 July 2009, they faced Crusaders of Northern Ireland in the UEFA Europa League second qualifying round; the 1st leg was drawn 1–1. They managed to win the second leg 4–2 and went out in the third qualifying round against Danish club Odense BK after losing 3–7 on aggregate.

On 16 July 2010, they were drawn against Liverpool in the UEFA Europa League 3rd qualifying round. In the first leg on 29 July 2010, they lost 2–0, losing the return leg 2–0 a week later.

In July 2011, they were named the best club in the World for that month by the IFFHS. The winning streak of five games in the Europa League, from which four were in July, plus a win against Bregalnica in the first round of the domestic league were more than enough for the International Federation of Football History & Statistics to name Rabotnički as the "Best club in the World for July 2011".

In March 2012, with 674 points on the IFFHS list Rabotnički became the best club from Macedonia in the 21st century.

On 11 May 2014, Rabotnichki won their fourth Macedonian First League title. After winning their third Macedonian Cup the previous week, they accomplished the double crown for the second time in club history.

Veterans
Association of Veterans of Rabotnichki has been functioning informally since the formation of the club Rabotnichki itself, in 1937.

Officially, the association of the veterans of Rabotnički is formally registered in front of the competent court of law with approval number 29/05 in 18.02.2005, and it is notified in the register of the associations of citizens and foundations under registration number 1928 by the name Rabotnički “Veterans” Skopje with main office in Skopje, city park in large numbers.
This association inherited the property of legal entity on 18 February 2005. Apart from this right, of independent legal entity, the association is functioning in association with Rabotnički, generally comparing its policies, delegate its own members in the governing bodies of the club, gives its own opinions, suggestions, and proposals of a common interest, and all this with a purpose-achieving greater results and giving real affirmation of the club in both Macedonia and abroad.

Basic sources of financing of the association are: enrollment fee, sponsorship, as well as goods that are supplied and sold by the club. Members of the association are: Active members who have spent a number of years in the running of the club as well as sportsmen who were active football players in the club for many years, as well as many citizens who have shown an interest in joining the association. Accordingly, the association has members from all branches of society life including: lawyers, professors, directors of famous companies, ambassadors, coaches, famous football players representatives and many other famous persons from the sport and public life.

President of the association since its inception is the Lawyer Dragan Popovski, the Secretary-General is Gojko Stojanovski, and the selector is Jastrat Janevski. It is with special interest that we mention that the association of veterans of FK Rabotnički is first of its kind in the  Republic of Macedonia. From the moment of creation, the association has shown great development of football matters, while creating and expanding upon friendly relations with other football clubs both in Macedonia and abroad.

To this end the association has established friendly sporting relations with teams from Bulgaria, Serbia, Montenegro, Turkey, Greece, Slovenia, Croatia and Sweden among others.
The association Rabotnički Veterans is a regular participant in the traditional Albena Cup, held in Albena, Bulgaria every year. As well as in competitive games with teams in Bulgaria it has played a couple of games with teams from Romania with teams from Turkey and with teams from Serbia .

Almost with every concerned with the association have through hard work and persistence gained excellent results and helped it win numerous cups and international recognition.

The successful activity of the association continues further more. As charged and responsible inheritors of the positive changes are: Dokovski, Popovski, Lazarov, Milosevski, Zefic, M.Andreevski, G.Stojanovski, D.Stojanovski, Janevski, N.Bogoevski, S.Bogojevski, Dzipunov, Janev, Jovevski, Jugilizov, Bojcevski, Ilievski, Petkovski.

Stadium

FK Rabotnički's home venue is Toshe Proeski Arena. Its current capacity is 33,011 spectators which puts it among 10 largest stadiums on the Balkans. The pitch is 105 x 68 m. Two big scoreboards, 18 x 6 m are installed on both East and West stands. There are 494 VIP boxes and 386 media seats, all of them on the North stand. Toshe Proeski Arena is an all-seater ground with 80% of the seats covered from inclement weather.

Training facility
The training facility of Rabotnički is located in the city park opposite of the Toshe Proeski Arena, where Rabotnički plays its official matches in the domestic league and European competition. At the moment there are three completely renovated football fields (two with flood lighting). At the end of 2007 new facilities as a back–up for the football fields were built: containing dressing rooms, rooms for rest, a restaurant, gym and fitness area, a medical room and all sport and medical care infrastructures that are at the service of the players and support better conditions for work and better performance for the club.

Honours
Champions
 Winners (10): 1953, 1966, 1968, 1973, 1977, 1980, 2004–05, 2005–06, 2007–08, 2013–14
Runners-up: 2006–07, 2009–10, 2014–15

Macedonian Second League
Winners: 1997–98

Macedonian Football Cup
 Winners (10): 1954, 1957, 1974, 1978, 1983, 1988, 2007–08, 2008–09, 2013–14, 2014–15
Runners-up: 2009–10, 2011–12, 2015–16

Macedonian Supercup
Runners-up: 2015

Recent seasons

1The 2019–20 season was abandoned due to the COVID-19 pandemic in North Macedonia.

Rabotnički in Europe

Rabotnichki's first competitive European match was a 0–2 loss against Vorskla Poltava in the 2000–01 UEFA Cup. Krste Velkoski holds the record for most appearances in Europe for the club with 22. Also, he is a top scorer in UEFA club competitions with 6 goals. The biggest win in UEFA competition was against FC Lusitanos in the 2010–11 Europa League, defeating them by the score of 5–0, 6–0 and 11–0 on aggregate.

Players

Current squad

Coaching staff
As of 17 June 2019

Club Management

Historical list of coaches

 Nikola Ilievski (1989 – 1990)
 Mirsad Jonuz (1996 – 2000)
 Ilija Dimoski (2001 – 2002)
 Mirsad Jonuz (2002 – 2003)
 Gjore Jovanovski (2003 – Apr 2007)
 Dragoljub Bekvalac (14 Apr 2007 – Jun 2008)
 Boban Babunski (24 Jun 2008 – Apr 2009)
 Gordan Zdravkov (29 Apr 2009 – Jun 2009)
 Zoran Stratev (Jul 2009 – Dec 2010)
 Vlatko Kostov (28 Dec 2010 – Mar 2011)
 Goran Petreski (4 Apr 2011 – Oct 2011)
 Pavel Nedelkovski (int.) (Oct 2011)
 Gjore Jovanovski (8 Nov 2011 – Dec 2011)
 Robert Pevnik (3 Jan 2012 – Jun 2012)
 Goran Petreski (Jul 2012 – Nov 2012)
 Zikica Tasevski (6 Nov 2012 – Jun 2013)
 Igor Angelovski (Jul 2013 – Dec 2015)
 Tomislav Franc (17 Dec 2015 – Jul 2016)
 Viktor Trenevski (Aug 2016 – Sep 2017)
 Goran Stankovski (Sep 2017 – Apr 2018)
 Gjore Jovanovski (2018)
 Zikica Tasevski (Oct 2018 – Mar 2019)
 Blaze Lazarevski (Mar 2019 – Jun 2019)
 Aleksandar Vlaho (Jul 2019 – Oct 2019)
 Ratko Dostanić (Jan 2020 – present)

Supporters
There were two supporters groups. The supporters group Legija V was formed back in 2008. They followed the club everywhere and supported the players at every game. Before 2008 there was the group called Romantičari (formed in 2001) which was dissolved. The supporters group Debar Maalo was formed for the Macedonian. cup final vs. Makedonija GP in 2009. Since 2010 Rabotnicki doesn't have an official supporters group.

References

External links

Official Website 
Club info at MacedonianFootball 
Football Federation of Macedonia 

 
Football clubs in Yugoslavia
Football clubs in Skopje
Association football clubs established in 1937
1937 establishments in Yugoslavia
Railway association football teams